St. John's Episcopal Cathedral is the cathedral of the Episcopal Diocese of Taiwan, a diocese of the Episcopal Church of the United States, which is part of the worldwide Anglican Communion. The cathedral church is located at No. 280, Second Section, Fuhsing South Road, Da'an District, Taipei, Taiwan.

A large building in southern Taipei, it was built in 1955 by Chinese Anglicans who had fled mainland China in 1949 after the Chinese Communist Revolution. It was elevated to a cathedral when the Diocese of Taiwan was established in 1961–1962. The annex was added in 1963.

Transportation
The cathedral is south of Technology Building Station of Taipei Metro, within walking distance.

See also
 St John's Cathedral (Hong Kong)

External links
 
 YouTube channel
 Taiwan Episcopal Church (i.e., the Episcopal Diocese of Taiwan)

Cathedrals in Taiwan
Churches in Taipei
Anglican cathedrals in Asia
Anglican church buildings in Asia
Churches completed in 1955
1955 establishments in Taiwan